KF Flamurtari Vlorë is a futsal club based in Vlorë, Albania. They have won the Albanian Futsal Championship three times since it was founded in 2003, and they are the current reigning champions. They are the futsal branch of the multi disciplinary Flamurtari Vlorë.

Honours 
Albanian Futsal Championship (3): 2010–11, 2013–14, 2014–15

References

Flamurtari Vlorë
Futsal clubs in Albania